A settler is a person who has migrated to an area and established a permanent residence there, often to colonize the area. 

A settler who migrates to an area previously uninhabited or sparsely inhabited may be described as a pioneer.

Settlers are generally from a sedentary culture, as opposed to nomadic peoples who may move settlements seasonally, within traditional territories. Settlement sometimes relies on dispossession of already established populations within the contested area, and can be a very violent process. Sometimes settlers are backed by governments or large countries. Settlements can prevent native people from continuing their work.

Historical usage 

One can witness how settlers very often occupied land previously residents to long-established peoples, designated as Indigenous (also called "natives", "Aborigines" or, in the Americas, "Indians").

The process by which Indigenous territories are settled by foreign peoples is usually called settler colonialism. It relies upon a process of often violent dispossession.

The word "settler" was not originally usually used in relation to a variety of peoples who became a part of settler societies, such as enslaved Africans (e.g. in the United States) or convicts (such as in the Colonial America, c. 1615–1775; Australia 1788–1868).

In the figurative usage, a "person who goes first or does something first" also applies to the American English use of "pioneer" to refer to a settlera person who has migrated to a less occupied area and established permanent residence there, often to colonize the area; as first recorded in English in 1605. In United States history it refers to Europeans who were part of settling new lands on Indigenous territories. 

In this usage, pioneers are usually among the first to an area, whereas settlers can arrive after first settlement and join others in the process of human settlement. This correlates with the work of military pioneers who were tasked with construction of camps before the main body of troops would arrive at the designated campsite.

In Imperial Russia, the government invited Russians or foreign nationals to settle in sparsely populated lands. These settlers were called "colonists". See, e.g., articles Slavo-Serbia, Volga German, Volhynia, Russians in Kazakhstan.

Although they are often thought of as traveling by sea—the dominant form of travel in the early modern era—significant waves of settlement could also use long overland routes, such as the Great Trek by the Boer-Afrikaners in South Africa, or the Oregon Trail in the United States.

Anthropological usage 
Anthropologists record tribal displacement of native settlers who drive another tribe from the lands it held, such as the settlement of lands in the area now called Carmel-by-the-Sea, California where Ohlone peoples settled in areas previously inhabited by the Esselen tribe (Bainbridge, 1977).

Modern usage 

In Canada, the term settler is currently used to describe "the non-Indigenous peoples living in Canada who form the European-descended sociopolitical majority," asserting that settler colonialism is an ongoing phenomenon. The usage is controversial.

In the Middle East, there are a number of references to various squatter and specific policies referred as "settler". Among those:
 Iraq – the Arabization program of the Ba'ath Party in the late 1970s in North Iraq, which aimed at settling Arab populations instead of Kurds following the Second Iraqi-Kurdish War.
 Israel – Israelis who moved to areas captured during the Six-Day War in 1967 (such as the Gaza Strip and West Bank) in the absence of a final peace agreement.
 Syria – In recent times, Arab settlers have also moved in large numbers to ethnic minority areas, such as northeast Syria.
 Cyprus – In the aftermath of the Turkish invasion of Cyprus, the Turkish government started settling farmers from the mainland in the newly declared Turkish Republic of Northern Cyprus. Today it is estimated that these settlers constitute around half the population of Northern Cyprus.

Causes of emigration 

The reasons for the emigration of settlers vary, but often they include the following factors and incentives: the desire to start a new and better life in a foreign land, personal financial hardship, social, cultural, ethnic, or religious persecution (e.g., the Pilgrims and Mormons), penal deportation (e.g. of convicted criminals from England to Australia) political oppression, and government incentive policies aimed at encouraging foreign settlement.

The colony concerned is sometimes controlled by the government of a settler's home country, and emigration is sometimes approved by an imperial government.

See also

References 

 
Human migration
Anthropological categories of peoples
Cultural anthropology
Settler colonialism